The Diocese of Gallup is a Latin Church ecclesiastical territory or diocese of the Catholic Church in the southwestern region of the United States, encompassing counties in the states of Arizona (Navajo and Apache) and New Mexico (San Juan, McKinley, Cibola, Catron) and parts of Rio Arriba, Sandoval, Bernalillo, and Valencia Counties west of 106,52',41" meridian in New Mexico. The mother church is the Sacred Heart Cathedral in Gallup, New Mexico.

The Diocese of Gallup is one of four Latin Church Catholic dioceses in the United States to have territory in more than one federal entity; the Diocese of Wilmington and the Diocese of Norwich both have territory in two states and the Archdiocese of Washington contains the District of Columbia and five counties in Maryland. The Diocese of Gallup is a suffragan diocese in the ecclesiastical province of the metropolitan Archdiocese of Santa Fe.

History
Pope Pius XII canonically erected the diocese on December 16, 1939, taking its territory from the Archdiocese of Santa Fe and the Roman Catholic Diocese of Tucson.

Sex abuse and bankruptcy

On the weekend of August 31-September 1, 2013, a letter from Bishop Wall was read at all Masses stating that the Diocese of Gallup, in order to address the rising number of sexual abuse claims being made, would seek protection under Chapter 11 of the United States Bankruptcy Code. It filed for bankruptcy November 12, 2013. In February 2017, it was announced that the diocese had paid more than $17.6 million to 57 people who were sexually abused by clergy in the diocese.

Bishops

The list of bishops and their tenures of service:

Bishops of Gallup
 Bernard T. Espelage (1940–1969)
 Jerome J. Hastrich (1969–1990)
 Donald Edmond Pelotte (1990–2008)
 James Sean Wall (2009–present)

Coadjutor bishop
 Donald Edmond Pelotte (1986–1990)

Schools

With high school divisions:
 St. Michael Indian School (K-12), St. Michaels, Arizona
Formerly with high school divisions:
 Gallup Catholic School (was K-12), Gallup, New Mexico  (High school closed in 2013)
 St. Bonaventure School (was K-12), Thoreau, New Mexico (High school closed in 2001)

Arms

See also 
Roman Catholic Diocese of Phoenix
Roman Catholic Diocese of Tucson

References

External links
Roman Catholic Diocese of Gallup Official Site
Arizona Catholic Conference

 
Diocese of Gallup
Diocese of Gallup
Gallup, New Mexico
Christian organizations established in 1939
Gallup
1939 establishments in New Mexico
Gallup
Companies that filed for Chapter 11 bankruptcy in 2013